Sophie Hannah Marguerite Hosking MBE (born 25 January 1986) is a retired British rower.

Personal life
Hosking was born in 1986. The lightweight rower David Hosking is her father. She attended Kingston Grammar School in London, before completing an undergraduate degree in Chemistry and Physics at Trevelyan College, Durham University, graduating in 2007. Following her retirement from competitive rowing, Hosking embarked on a new career as a solicitor and is now the UK Head of Legal at Cazoo.

Rowing career
She is a member of the London Rowing Club in Putney. A fixture in British lightweight sculling since 2007, Hosking won a surprise gold medal for Great Britain in the 2012 Olympics lightweight double sculls, along with Kat Copeland. Hosking and Copeland's success was the second of six gold medals won by Great Britain on the middle Saturday of the 2012 Games, on what became known in the United Kingdom as Super Saturday.

She was part of the British squad that topped the medal table at the 2011 World Rowing Championships in Bled, where she won a bronze medal as part of the lightweight double sculls with Hester Goodsell.

Awards
Hosking was appointed Member of the Order of the British Empire (MBE) in the 2013 New Year Honours for services to rowing.

See also
 2012 Olympics gold post boxes in the United Kingdom

References

External links 
 
 Sophie Hosking at British Rowing (archived)
 
 

1986 births
Living people
British female rowers
Sportspeople from Edinburgh
Rowers at the 2012 Summer Olympics
Olympic rowers of Great Britain
Olympic gold medallists for Great Britain
Alumni of Trevelyan College, Durham
People educated at Kingston Grammar School
Olympic medalists in rowing
Members of the Order of the British Empire
Medalists at the 2012 Summer Olympics
Scottish female rowers
World Rowing Championships medalists for Great Britain
Stewards of Henley Royal Regatta
Durham University Boat Club rowers